Nizar Niyas (born 18 August 1990) is an Indian first-class cricketer who plays for Kerala.

References

External links
 

1990 births
Living people
Indian cricketers
Kerala cricketers
People from Thiruvananthapuram district
Cricketers from Kerala